Abgar IX Severus was king of Osroene.

Abgar succeeded his father, Abgar VIII in 212. In 213 Abgar IX and his son were summoned to Rome and murdered at the orders of Caracalla. A year later Caracalla ended the independence of Osroene and incorporated it as a province into Roman Empire.

References

Sources
 
 

Kings of Osroene
3rd-century Arabs